The Real McCoy is a 1993 American heist crime film, directed by Russell Mulcahy and starring Kim Basinger, Val Kilmer and Terence Stamp.

Plot

Karen McCoy (Kim Basinger) is released from prison with nothing but the clothes on her back. Before being incarcerated, Karen was the bank robber of her time but now she wishes for nothing more than to settle down and start a new life.

Unfortunately, between a dirty parole officer, old business partners and an idiot ex-husband, McCoy will have to do the unthinkable to save her son (Zack English) and new heartthrob J.T. (Val Kilmer): another bank job.

Cast

Reception

Box office

Was a box office bomb.

Critical response
The film earned negative reviews from critics. The Real McCoy holds an 22% rating on Rotten Tomatoes based on 18 reviews, with an average rating of 4.13/10. Roger Ebert of the Chicago Sun-Times gave it 2 stars, saying, "... "The Real McCoy" took me back to... heist movies where a bank vault was subjected to high-tech manipulations by athletic super-crooks... those same scenes apparently took the film's authors back to the very same sources, since "The Real McCoy" recycles the same devices, not quite as well as the originals."

References

External links 
 
 
 
 
 Google Movie Page

1990s English-language films
1993 films
1993 crime thriller films
1990s heist films
American crime thriller films
American heist films
Films about bank robbery
Films set in Atlanta
Films based on British novels
Films directed by Russell Mulcahy
Films produced by Martin Bregman
Films scored by Brad Fiedel
Films with screenplays by William Davies
Universal Pictures films
1990s American films